Jeremy Stansfield (born 1970) is a British engineer and television presenter who is best known for presenting the BBC One science show Bang Goes the Theory.

Career
Stansfield has a degree in aeronautics from Bristol University and, before his television career, worked in a Czech school, as a shepherd in the Australian outback, and briefly in stand-up comedy. Stansfield was an on-screen ballistics expert for the television show Scrapheap Challenge and went on to become a permanent part of the engineering team for subsequent series.

Among his inventions are a compressed-air powered motorcycle, and boots that walk on water (for which he won a New Scientist prize).

In 2010, Stansfield used vacuum cleaners to create "Spider-Man style" climbing gloves, climbing 30 feet up a brick wall. He also drove a modified 1988 Volkswagen Scirocco 210 miles from London to Manchester using coffee granules for fuel.

In 2013 Stansfield sustained injuries during filming of a segment for the series Bang Goes the Theory. The segment was about the safety of front-facing and rear-facing seats in car crashes. Stansfield was in a cart which crashed, simulating the impact of a car hitting a lamppost and suffered from spine and brain injuries as a result.

In 2021 Stansfield was awarded £1.6m in damages after a High Court battle. It emerged in court that the BBC had been warned of the dangers by crash test experts but this information was never passed to Stansfield.

Filmography
Television

Film

References

External links 
 

British engineers
British television presenters
Living people
1970 births